Nicholson Island may refer to:

 Nicholson Island (Antarctica), part of the Bailey Rocks, off Antarctica
 Nicholson Island (Lake Ontario) an island in Ontario's Prince Edward County, Canada
 Nicholson Island (Pennsylvania) an island on the Alleghany River, US
 Nicholson Island (Ritchie's Archipelago), Andaman Islands, India